I Am Not a Hipster is a 2012 American independent drama film written and directed by Destin Daniel Cretton and starring Dominic Bogart.  It is Cretton's directorial debut.

Cast
Dominic Bogart as Brooke Hyde
Alvaro Orlando as Clarke
Tammy Minoff as Joy
Lauren Coleman as Spring
Kandis Erickson as Merrily
Brad William Henke as Bradley Haines
Adam Shapiro as Dennis / Spaceface
Tania Verafield as Kells
Eva Mah as Taylor
Michael Harding as Dad

Reception
The review consensus at Rotten Tomatoes for I Am Not a Hipster had 71% of critics recommending the film, based on seven reviews and an average rating of 7.70 out of 10.  Nathan Rabin of The A.V. Club graded the film a B−.

References

External links
 
 
 

American drama films
2012 directorial debut films
2012 films
Films directed by Destin Daniel Cretton
Films scored by Joel P. West
Films with screenplays by Destin Daniel Cretton
2012 drama films
2010s English-language films
2010s American films
Films set in San Diego